In the Matter of Karen Ann Quinlan is a 1977 American television film about Karen Ann Quinlan. It was directed by Glenn Jordan.

"This is a drama without a heavy," said producer Warren Bush.

Cast
Brian Keith as Joe Quinlan
Piper Laurie as Julie Quinlan
David Huffman as Paul Armstrong
Stephanie Zimbalist as Mary Ellen Quinlan
Biff McGuire as Father Tom
David Spielberg as Dr Mason
Bert Freed as Dr Julius Korein
Louise Latham as Sister Mary Luke
Mary Anne Grayson as Karen
Habibageli as Dr Hanif
Byron Morrow as Attorney General

Reception
The New York Times wrote it was "affecting" largely due to the performances of Laurie and Keith.

References

External links
In the Matter of Karen Ann Quinlan at IMDb
In the Matter of Karen Ann Quinlan at TCMDB

1977 television films
1977 films